The 2020–21 season was 4th season in the top Ukrainian football league for FC Lviv. Lviv competed in Premier League and Ukrainian Cup.

Players

Squad information

Transfers

In

Out

Pre-season and friendlies

Competitions

Overall

Premier League

League table

Results summary

Results by round

Matches

Ukrainian Cup

Statistics

Appearances and goals

|-
! colspan=16 style=background:#dcdcdc; text-align:center| Goalkeepers

|-
! colspan=16 style=background:#dcdcdc; text-align:center| Defenders

|-
! colspan=16 style=background:#dcdcdc; text-align:center| Midfielders 

|-
! colspan=16 style=background:#dcdcdc; text-align:center| Forwards

|-
! colspan=16 style=background:#dcdcdc; text-align:center| Players transferred out during the season

Last updated: 9 May 2021

Goalscorers

Last updated: 9 May 2021

Clean sheets

Last updated: 24 April 2021

Disciplinary record

Last updated: 9 May 2021

Attendances

Last updated: 9 May 2021

References

External links
 Official website

FC Lviv
Lviv